Vatica soepadmoi is a species of plant in the family Dipterocarpaceae.

Distribution
It is a tree endemic to Sumatra. It is a critically endangered species threatened by habitat loss.

References

soepadmoi
Endemic flora of Sumatra
Trees of Sumatra
Critically endangered flora of Asia
Taxonomy articles created by Polbot